The deep auricular artery is a branch of the maxillary artery. The deep auricular artery pierces the external acoustic meatus. It provides arterial supply to the skin of the external acoustic meatus, and contributes arterial supply to the tympanic membrane, and (via a branch) the temporomandibular joint.

Anatomy

Origin 
It is a branch of the (mandibular part of) the maxillary artery. It often arises in common with the anterior tympanic artery.

Course 
It ascends in the substance of the parotid gland, behind the temporomandibular articulation, and pierces (the cartilaginous or bony wall of) the external acoustic meatus.

Distribution 
It supplies its cuticular lining and the outer surface of the tympanic membrane.

It gives a branch to the temporomandibular joint.

References

External links
 

Arteries of the head and neck